The 2020–21 season was Manchester United Women's third season since they were founded and their second in the FA Women's Super League, the professional top-flight women's league in England. The club also competed in the FA Cup and League Cup.

In March 2021, it was announced the team would make their Old Trafford debut in a league match against West Ham United despite fans not yet allowed to return to stadiums due to the ongoing COVID-19 pandemic. Manchester United won the game 2–0.

On 12 May 2021, it was announced Casey Stoney would be stepping down as manager at the end of the season amid tensions surrounding the lack of backing and resources from the club, particularly training facilities.

Pre-season 
Manchester United returned to preseason training on 24 July 2020. On 9 August, they played their first preseason friendly, hosting SWPL champions Glasgow City who were preparing for the restart of the 2019–20 UEFA Women's Champions League.

FA Women's Super League

Matches

Table

Women's FA Cup 

As a member of the top two tiers, United will enter the FA Cup in the fourth round proper, originally scheduled to take place on 31 January 2021. The round was ultimately rescheduled for 18 April following the suspension of the competition at the second round stage on 4 January in response to the COVID-19 pandemic. United were drawn away to Burnley, the first competitive match against a team outside of the top two divisions since the team's creation in 2018. Having progressed to the fifth round with a 6–0 win over Burnley, United were eliminated by 2020–21 Championship winners Leicester City 3–2 on 16 May 2021, Casey Stoney's last game in charge of the team.

FA Women's League Cup

Group stage 
In a change of format to reduce the number of group stage games by two, the League Cup was expanded into six regional groups instead of four, with the six group winners plus the two best second place teams qualifying for the knockout round. Manchester United were entered into Group C for the 2020–21 League Cup alongside fellow WSL teams Everton and Manchester City, and Championship side Liverpool. After losing the opening round fixture to Liverpool, United's second game against Everton was postponed due to safety concerns following overnight wind damage to the stadium. On 19 November, United contested their first penalty shoot-out following a goalless draw with City to determine which side would get the bonus point per competition rules. United successfully scored all four of their penalties (Toone, Groenen, Millie Turner and Ladd) while an Emily Ramsey save on Laura Coombs' second penalty set up a decisive fifth attempt for City which was duly missed by former United captain Alex Greenwood. Despite earning the bonus point, failing to win meant United could not progress to the knockout stage of the League Cup for the first time having reached the semi-finals the previous two seasons. The rearranged third fixture was scheduled for 16 December with opponents Everton still potentially able to qualify as one of the best second-place teams.

Squad statistics 

Numbers in brackets denote appearances as substitute.
Key to positions: GK – Goalkeeper; DF – Defender; MF – Midfielder; FW – Forward

Transfers

In

Out

Loans out

Notes

References

External links 
  

2020-21
Manchester United